S'Archittu (Translation: "the little arch," in the Sardinian language) is a small coastal tourist resort near Oristano (Sardinia, Italy), part of the municipality of Cuglieri.

Toponym 
The locality takes its name from the rock arch (S'Archittu) which encloses the beach, easily reachable by walk via a footway; during summer nights the arch is illuminated.
The top of the arch is used for sea diving and it was the location of one event in the 2001 High Dive World Championship.
The arch, about 17 metres high, is a result of marine erosion of an ancient cave formed in the limestone.

Nearby 
Approximately 1 km to the south of S'Archittu is Torre del Pozzo ("The Well's Tower).

References

External links 
 A local website

Frazioni of the Province of Oristano